Air Commodore Mehar Singh, MVC, DSO, (20 March 1915 – 11 March 1952) was a fighter pilot in the Indian Air Force. He was affectionately known as 'Mehar Baba', a sobriquet coined by Aspy Engineer. Considered a Legend of the IAF, he last served as the Air Officer Commanding No. 1 Operational Group.

Early life and education 
Mehar Singh was born on 20 March 1915 at Lyallpur (now Faisalabad in Pakistan). He was selected for the Royal Air Force College Cranwell (RAFC), England in 1933 while he was in the final year of Bachelor of Science and joined in 1934. He performed exceedingly well at Cranwell, which impressed college authorities. 

Air Vice Marshall H. M. Grave, commandant, RAFC wrote of Singh:

Military career

Early career
Singh was commissioned as a pilot officer in August 1936 and posted to No. 1 Squadron, then the only squadron in RAF India. It was raised on 1 April 1933 at Karachi with four Westland Wapiti aircraft. The Indian element consisted of six officers and nine technicians then known as Hawai Sepoys. Singh was amongst the first six pioneering officers who joined the squadron. Flight Lieutenant C. A. Bouchier, DFC, an officer of the Royal Air Force (RAF) was the first commanding officer of the squadron.

Under the leadership of Singh, No. 6 Squadron IAF with its Hawker Hurricane aircraft, came to be known as 'The Eyes of the 14th Army', which was commanded by General William Slim.

On 14 May 1947, he was promoted to the acting rank of Group Captain and was appointed Group Captain in charge of Flying Training at Air headquarters. He was promoted to the rank along with Wing Commander Narendra.

Indo-Pakistani War of 1947–1948
After the accession of Jammu and Kashmir on 26 October 1947, the first Indian Army units were airlifted to Srinagar, starting with the 1st battalion Sikh Regiment (1 Sikh) led by Lieutenant Colonel Dewan Ranjit Rai. An entire infantry brigade was to be airlifted. Mehar Singh was the first pilot to land at Srinagar and as the AOC No. 1 Operational Group, he inducted the troops in just five days. Lord Mountbatten lauded this feat, saying that he didn't know of an instance of an airlift being effected in such a short time.

Singh then established an air bridge to Poonch. He personally piloted the first aircraft and landed at Poonch Airport. The airstrip was surrounded by streams on three sides and has a steep approach. Against heavy odds, he landed a Douglas with three tons of load against normal rated load of one ton. Moreover, he did so without any landing aids, the airstrip being lit with the help of oil lamps.

Singh was also the first pilot to land in Leh in Ladakh. Along with Major General K S Thimayya as passenger, led a flight of Six Dakotas of No. 12 Squadron IAF across the Himalayas, towering up to 24000 feet negotiating the Zoji La and Fotu La passes and landed at an improvised sandy airstrip next to the Indus river at a height of 11540 feet. Singh did this without de-icing equipment, cabin pressurisation or route maps.

Awards and decorations

Distinguished Service Order
In March 1944, then Acting Squadron Leader Mehar Singh was awarded the Distinguished Service Order (DSO), the only officer of the Indian Air Force to have won this award.

The citation of the DSO reads as follows:

Maha Vir Chakra
On 26 January 1950, when the Awards and decorations of the Indian Armed Forces were established, Air Commodore Mehar Singh was awarded the second-highest war-time military decoration, the Maha Vir Chakra (MVC).

The citation of the MVC reads as follows:

Resignation and life after IAF 
Singh resigned from the IAF on 27 September 1948, over differences with some senior officers on service matters, instead of getting involved in controversy.
After his retirement, Singh served as the personal adviser to the Maharaja of Patiala Yadavindra Singh, the Rajpramukh of Patiala and East Punjab States Union (PEPSU).

Death 
On the night of 16 March 1952, Singh was flying from Jammu to New Delhi and was caught in a storm, killing him.

Legacy
Singh was considered to be a legendary pilot and a flying prodigy. He was the first pilot to land in Srinagar, Poonch, Leh and Daulat Beg Oldi. In a relatively short career of 12 years, he rose to the rank of air commodore and was decorated with two war-time gallantry awards.

In 2018, the Indian Air Force constituted the Meher Baba Prize in the honour of Air Commodore Mehar Singh for drones development.

References

|-

|-

1915 births
1952 deaths
Aviators killed in aviation accidents or incidents in India
Indian Air Force officers
People from Faisalabad
Punjabi people
Victims of aviation accidents or incidents in 1952
Indian Companions of the Distinguished Service Order
Recipients of the Maha Vir Chakra